Kuratica or slang Kurajca is a village in the municipality of Ohrid, North Macedonia. It used to be part of the former municipality of Kosel.

Name 
The placename Kuratica is possibly an Aromanian toponym derived from the word curát meaning clear, fast, clean alongside the suffix ica. The village is located near a fast running mountain stream.

Demographics
According to the statistics of Bulgarian ethnographer Vasil Kanchov from 1900, 395 inhabitants lived in Kuratica, all Bulgarian Exarchists. 

According to the 2002 census, the village had a total of 326 inhabitants. Ethnic groups in the village include:
Macedonians 326

Notable People
~Avramoski Brothers~

Eftim Trenev Avramoski - Macedonian revolutionary from IMRO

Najde Janev Avramoski - Macedonian revolutionary from IMRO

Vidan Stevanovski Avramoski - Macedonian revolutionary from IMRO

Lambe Avramoski - Macedonian revolutionary from IMRO

~Father & Son~ (Not related to Avramoski Brothers)

Cvetko Petrev Avramoski - Macedonian revolutionary from IMRO

Risto Cvetkov Avramoski - Macedonian revolutionary from IMRO

Sandre Dimov Koleski - Macedonian revolutionary from IMRO

Veljan Ivanov Georgievski - Macedonian revolutionary from IMRO

Risto Stepanov Andreski - Macedonian revolutionary from IMRO

See also
Arbinovo
Botun
Laktinje
Sirula

References

External links

Villages in Ohrid Municipality